() is a term in Spanish for a variety of custards and similar delicacies in the Spanish-speaking world. In Colombia, the delicacy does not include eggs, and is called .

Etymology

Varieties

Spain
In Spain,  is a custard dish typically made with milk, sugar, vanilla, eggs, and
cinnamon. The dish
is prepared by gently boiling the milk and slowly stirring in the eggs (often just the yolks) and other ingredients to create a sweet custard. The differences between Spanish , English custard or French  are vague, mainly related to their thickness.

This custard (a thin pouring cream and not a coagulated custard) is similar to flan but is typically richer, includes cinnamon, and does not include caramel.

New Mexico
New Mexican natillas are derived directly from the recipes of Spain as a result of the Spanish Conquest and the existing Spanish descendants. Such natillas are custard-like in consistency and may, in some recipes, have flour in addition to egg whites. They are not to be confused with Mexican natillas.

Colombia
Some of the ingredients include milk,  (blocks of brown sugar), cinnamon sticks, and flour or cornstarch. Occasionally people like to add grated coconut or raisins but these are optional ingredients. To garnish it, powdered cinnamon is spread on top of the finished natilla. Natilla is found all throughout the Christmas season and usually stores sell pre-made natilla; but one of the best known Christmas traditions in Colombia is making natilla in an improvised campfire in the streets or home patios.

Peru
This term is used in Peru, especially the city of Piura, a spread made of milk and chancaca that is boiled until it is thick and the sugar has caramelized to a rich brown color. The Peruvian confection is arguably more similar to Spanish natilla except that it is somewhat thicker and has no eggs.

Mexico
In Mexico, Natillas are also found and resemble a thicker version of the dessert drink called "Atole."

Costa Rica
In Costa Rica, the term is used for a sour cream-like dairy product used as a condiment with a variety of dishes. The product is homogenized and pasteurized milk with a lower fat content (about 12%) than normal sour cream, some brands add salt to the cream.

Cuba
Natilla in Cuba is classified as a cold custard dessert. Natilla is made with cornstarch, vanilla, sugar, eggs, lemon peel, cinnamon, and evaporated milk. Typically served on Christmas in small cups with cinnamon sprinkled on top.

Puerto Rico
There are two versions of this dessert that exist on the island.

One version is served for breakfast and cooked stove top in a pot. Served cold or hot, has less or no sugar because it is often served with honey, fruit and nuts.

Another version using the same ingredients is served on Christmas and baked in same fashion as crème brûlée.

Both versions include, milk, coconut cream, sugar, a large amount of egg yolks, cornstarch, cinnamon, vanilla, zest, and orange blossom water.

Puerto Rican Natilla can be bought all year around in supermarkets and convenient stores as a prepackaged powder with just the requirement of heating with milk.

Guam
In Guam, the dish is often called latiya and was likely first introduced in the 17th to 19th centuries. It is often made with canned evaporated or condensed milk.

See also
 Buñuelos
 Flan
 Hojuelas
 List of custard desserts
 Manjar blanco

References

Desserts
Custard desserts
Spanish cuisine
Colombian cuisine
Peruvian cuisine
Mexican cuisine
New Mexican cuisine
Costa Rican cuisine
Puerto Rican cuisine
Cuban cuisine